Muhammad Ghous Pasha is a Pakistani actor and model. He has appeared in Urdu drama series and telefilms in Pakistan. Ghous has been in television dramas, series, telefilms and sitcoms in Pakistan. He has appeared in Haseena Moin's Meri Behen Maya and Mehreen Jabbar's Rehai. He has made his first Lollywood film Jalaibee in 2013.

Personal life 
Ghous was born in Karachi, Pakistan.

Career 
Ghous started working as a model before moving on to acting. He began his television career with a small appearance in "Dil Diya Dehleez" (2009). Some other works include Massi Aur Malika, Chudween Ka Chand, Mannchalay, Kuch Unkahi Batain, Koi Jane Na, Baji, Larkiyan Muhalley Ki and Lamha Lamha Zindagi. He also appeared in telefilms including Pappu Ki Padoosan, Neeli Chatri, Love Hit Tou Life Hit, Haseena Maan Jaye Gi, and "Piano Girl".

Television 
 Mannchalay 
 Noor Pur Ki Rani
 Chemistry (drama)
 Perfume Chowk
 Kash Mai Teri Beti Na Hoti
 Kash Main Teri Beti Na Hoti
 Meri Behan Maya
 Raju Rocket
 Rehaai
 Sannata

Filmography 
 Jalaibee (2014)

Telefilms

Episodic Dramas 
 Kitni Girhain Baqi Hain - Poshak (2011)
 Kitni Girhain Baqi Hain - Tere Bina (2012)
 Kitni Girhain Baqi Hain - Be Rehamam (2013)

References

1983 births
Living people
Pakistani male models
Male actors from Karachi
Pakistani male television actors
University of Karachi alumni
People from Karachi